Moussa Sidibé (born 21 November 1994) is a Malian professional footballer who plays as a right winger for Thai League 1 club Ratchaburi, on loan from Johor Darul Ta'zim.

Club career
Born in Bamako, Sidibé moved to Spain at the age of 12, and finished his formation with CD Calasanz. He made his senior debut with Tercera División side SD Almazán during the 2013–14 season, before moving to fellow league team CD Ebro in January 2014.

Early career
Sidibé subsequently represented lower league sides AD Épila CF, UD Montecarlo, Benferri CF, UD Ibiza, CD Guadalajara (which he left after denouncing the club in the Association of Spanish Footballers), Algeciras CF and UE Llagostera, helping in the promotions of the latter two sides to Segunda División B.

Andorra
On 21 August 2019, he was transferred to FC Andorra in the third division, being an undisputed starter as his side achieved a mid-table finish.

Ponferradina
On 10 August 2020, Sidibé joined SD Ponferradina of Segunda División. He made his professional debut on 12 September, starting in a 1–2 home loss against CD Castellón for the second division championship.

Córdoba (loan)
On 31 January 2021, after being sparingly used, Sidibé was loaned to third division side Córdoba CF for the remainder of the season.

Costa Brava (loan)
On 31 August, he moved to Primera División RFEF side UE Costa Brava on loan for one year.

Johor Darul Ta'zim
On 21 January 2022, Sidibé's loan was cut short, and he subsequently terminated his contract with Ponfe to join Johor Darul Ta'zim.

Career statistics

References

External links

1994 births
Living people
Sportspeople from Bamako
Malian footballers
Association football wingers
Segunda División players
Primera Federación players
Segunda División B players
Tercera División players
Divisiones Regionales de Fútbol players
CD Ebro players
UD Ibiza players
CD Guadalajara (Spain) footballers
Algeciras CF footballers
UE Costa Brava players
FC Andorra players
SD Ponferradina players
Córdoba CF players
Moussa Sidibe
Moussa Sidibe
Malian expatriate footballers
Malian expatriate sportspeople in Spain
Expatriate footballers in Spain
21st-century Malian people